The English actor and comedian Terry-Thomas (1911–1990) performed in many mediums of light entertainment, including film, radio and theatre. His professional career spanned 50 years from 1933 until his retirement in 1983. During this time he became synonymous with playing the "silly-ass Englishman", a characterisation that he had portrayed from his time on the variety circuit.

Terry-Thomas made his film debut as an extra in the 1933 film, The Private Life of Henry VIII, which starred Charles Laughton in the title role; Terry-Thomas continued to undertake a series of small and uncredited film roles while his reputation grew on radio and television. He played his first role on radio in the 1938 BBC tea dance programme Friends to Tea, before spending the Second World War with the Royal Corps of Signals and ENSA, the Entertainments National Service Association.

After the war, Terry-Thomas began his stage career with an appearance in Piccadilly Hayride at the Prince of Wales Theatre, London; the show was a hit and he appeared in it from September 1946 until January 1948. In 1949 he appeared in his first television programme, Technical Hitch, and scored a success later that year with his own television series, How Do You View?, which was noted for being the first comedy series on British television. In 1956 he was cast by the Boulting brothers in Private's Progress. The role boosted his film career, initially in Britain, and then in America. In 1958 Terry-Thomas released the first of two solo comedy records, Strictly T-T; the same year he also appeared as Bertie Wooster in a cast recording of Jeeves, with Roger Livesey playing Jeeves.

During the 1960s and 1970s, Terry-Thomas' appearances on stage and radio were becoming less frequent but his television and film output remained consistent, despite his diagnosis with Parkinson's disease in 1971; by the mid-1980s, though, the disease had effectively ended his career. On his death, The Guardian observed that "as an upper class twit or as a debonair rascal, Terry-Thomas had few equals", and described him as "a national treasure", while The Independent considered that he "personified the Englishman as amiable bounder".

Filmography

Radio

Stage credits

Television

Discography

Albums

Singles

Notes and references
Notes

References

Bibliography

External links
 
 
 
 

Discographies of British artists
Male actor filmographies
British filmographies